Chernitsk is a rural locality (a settlement) in Barnaul, Altai Krai, Russia. The population was 822 as of 2013. There are 12 streets.

Geography 
Chernitsk is located 25 km southwest of Barnaul by road. Mokhnatushka is the nearest rural locality.

References 

Rural localities in Barnaul urban okrug